Kuepferia is a genus of flowering plants belonging to the family Gentianaceae.

Its native range stretches from (East and West) Himalaya to southern Central China. It is also found in Myanmar, Nepal and Tibet.

The genus name of Kuepferia is in honour of Philippe Küpfer (b. 1942), Swiss professor of botany at the University of Neuchâtel and also specialist in Gentianaceae and Ranunculaceae.
It was first described and published in Taxon Vol.63 on page 349 in 2014.

Known species
According to Kew:
Kuepferia caryophyllea 
Kuepferia chateri 
Kuepferia damyonensis 
Kuepferia decorata 
Kuepferia doxiongshangensis 
Kuepferia hicksii 
Kuepferia infelix 
Kuepferia kanchii 
Kuepferia leucantha 
Kuepferia masonii 
Kuepferia otophora 
Kuepferia otophoroides 
Kuepferia pringlei 
Kuepferia sichitoensis

References

Gentianaceae
Gentianaceae genera
Plants described in 2014
Flora of Tibet
Flora of China
Flora of East Himalaya
Flora of West Himalaya
Flora of Nepal
Flora of Myanmar